"There for You" may refer to:

"There for You" (Gorgon City and MK song), 2019
"There for You" (Martin Garrix and Troye Sivan song), 2017
"There for You" (Monét X Change song), 2019
"There for You" (Hilary Roberts song), 2018

See also
 I'll Be There for You (disambiguation)